Ehsaan, a Pakistani Urdu black & white film, was another melodious presentation by Waheed Murad & Pervaiz Malik as a duo. The film is a melodious love story, starring Waheed Murad, Zeba, Nirala, Rozina, Azad and Ibrahim Nafees. The film was produced by Waheed Murad and directed by Pervaiz Malik.

Cast
 Zeba
 Waheed Murad
 Rozina
 Nirala
 Ibrahim Nafees
 Azad
 Zahoor Ahmad
 Baby Jugnu
 S.M. Saleem
 Latif Charlie
 Khursheed Kanwar
 Mehmood Ali
 Rafiq Tingu

Release
Ehsaan was released on 3 June 1967 by Film Arts in cinemas of Karachi and Lahore and proved to be one of the popular films of 1967. The film completed 12 weeks on main cinemas and 40 weeks in other cinemas of Karachi and became a 'Silver Jubilee film'. The film had completed 50 weeks and became a 'Golden Jubilee film' in Lahore.

Plot
The story was written by Waheed Murad. It boasts a sensitive script as the psychiatrist Waheed falls in love with and woos young widow (and mother of a young daughter to boot) Zeba, a romance that was decidedly different for its time. Complications obviously arise but the movie remains surprisingly mature and for the most part doesn’t turn into a typical Lollywood melodrama.

Filming
Ehsaan was filmed in Karachi. During the shootings of Ehsaan, Zeba got married with Mohammad Ali, an arch rival of Waheed Murad. Zeba, instead of reaching Karachi for completing her shootings and honoring her commitment, probably went on a honeymoon. That meant dismantling of the film's set and a big financial loss to Film Arts. Waheed on being told of Zeba’s marriage blurted out, "not again!... She is turning into an Elizabeth Taylor," he said, after a pause. The film was shot in Eastern Film Studio of Karachi.

Music
The music and the songs are not as good as in Heera Aur Pathar (1964), Armaan (1966) and Doraha (1967), but there are a couple of popular numbers such as Eik naye more par... and Do akhian.... The music is composed by Sohail Rana and the songs are written by Masroor Anwar.

Songography
Do akhian... by Ahmed Rushdi & Irene Perveen
Ik naye more pe lay aaein hain haalaat mujhe.. by Mehdi Hassan
Ik naye more pe... by Mala
Aey meri zindagi... by Ahmed Rushdi & Mala

References

External links 

1967 films
Pakistani romantic drama films
1960s Urdu-language films
Pakistani black-and-white films
Films scored by Sohail Rana
Urdu-language Pakistani films